Les Ellis (born 2 March 1936) is an Australian cricketer. He played three first-class matches for New South Wales in 1964/65.

See also
 List of New South Wales representative cricketers

References

External links
 

1936 births
Living people
Australian cricketers
New South Wales cricketers
Cricketers from Newcastle, New South Wales